Aleksei Dmitriyevich Samylin (born 15 October 1997) is a Russian football player who plays for FC Veles Moscow.

Club career
He made his debut in the Russian Football National League for FC Veles Moscow on 10 July 2021 in a game against FC Yenisey Krasnoyarsk.

References

External links
 
 Profile by Russian Football National League

1997 births
Footballers from Moscow
Living people
Russian footballers
Association football defenders
FC Khimki players
FC Ararat Moscow players
FC Veles Moscow players
FC Saturn Ramenskoye players
Russian First League players
Russian Second League players